Achalcus flavicollis is a species of fly belonging to the family Dolichopodidae.

It is native to Europe.

References

Achalcinae
Diptera of Europe
Taxa named by Johann Wilhelm Meigen
Insects described in 1824